Timbang Island is a Malaysian island located in the Sulu Sea on the state of Sabah.

See also
 List of islands of Malaysia

Islands of Sabah